Alberto Elmore Fernández de Córdoba (August 28, 1844 – June 7, 1916) was a Peruvian lawyer, diplomat and politician. He was born in Lima, Peru. He was a member of the faculty of the National University of San Marcos. He was 3 times minister of foreign affairs (1887–1888, 1891, 1904) in the Government of Peru. He was Prime Minister of Peru (July – August 1891, May – September 1904).

Works
Legislación sobre privilegios industriales (1885)
Tratado de Derecho Comercial (2 volúmenes, 1888–1899)
Ensayo sobre la doctrina de la intervención internacional (1896), inicialmente leído en 1881.
Reformas del Código de Justicia Militar (1905)
Proyecto de codificación del Derecho Internacional Privado (1914)

Bibliography
 Basadre Grohmann, Jorge: Historia de la República del Perú. 1822 - 1933, Octava Edición, corregida y aumentada. Tomos 9 y 10. Editada por el Diario "La República" de Lima y la Universidad "Ricardo Palma". Impreso en Santiago de Chile, 1998.
 Tauro del Pino, Alberto: Enciclopedia Ilustrada del Perú. Tercera Edición. Tomo 6, D’AC/FER. Lima, PEISA, 2001. 

1844 births
1916 deaths
19th-century Peruvian judges
Peruvian diplomats
People from Lima
Foreign ministers of Peru
Academic staff of the National University of San Marcos